Habiganj, formerly known as Habibganj, is a district in north-eastern Bangladesh, located in the Sylhet Division. It was established as a district in 1984 as a successor to its subdivision status since 1867. It is named after its headquarters, the town of Habiganj.

History

Ancient
Prehistoric settlements were said to have been discovered in the Chaklapunji tea garden, near Chandirmazar of Chunarughat. Habiganj has also revealed a significant number of prehistoric tools from the bed of Balu Stream, a small ephemeral stream (water remains here only for a few hours after rainfall). Angularity and freshness of the fossil wood artifacts suggest that they did not come from a great distance and probably came from nearby hillocks. Typologically, technologically, and morphometrically, the artifacts are more or less the same as those found in the Lalmai, Comilla. The fossil wood assemblages of both of these areas are often classified into two groups: pre-neolithic assemblages without polished tools (hand axes, cleavers, scrapers, chopping tools, points etc.) and neolithic assemblages (hand axes, polished Celts, awls etc.).

The Hindu epic known as the Mahabharata mentions the marriage of Duryodhana of the Kauravas into a family that are thought to be inhabitants of present-day Habiganj.

Early medieval

In medieval times, there were numerous petty kingdoms that were situated in what is now Habiganj District such as Azmardan, Baniachang and Tungachal. In 1254, the Governor of Bengal Malik Ikhtiyaruddin Iuzbak invaded the Azmardan Raj. He defeated the local Raja, and plundered his wealth.

A feudal kingdom by the name of Tungachal was given to Epivishnu by Raja Upananda of Brahmachal in the 11th century. It was based in Rajapur in southern Habiganj. Following the murder of Upananda by the Gour Kingdom loyalists, Epivishnu refused to acknowledge Tungachal as a part of Gour. This led to a battle in 1258 on the banks of Ghungi Jurir Haor in Tungachal in which Epivishnu was murdered and Shandul was subsequently appointed as Tungachal's governor by Raja Govardhan of Gour. In response to Epivishnu's murder, the King of Tripura managed to annex Tungachal away from Gour and appointed Bhadra Janardan, Epivishnu's minister, to govern Tungachal. Janardan was deposed during the reign of Govinda of Gour and replaced by Achak Narayan.

Following the Conquest of Sylhet in 1303, Syed Nasiruddin led a contingent of 1000 soldiers along with the help of 12 saints to capture Tungachal in 1304. Nasiruddin was the military commander of Shamsuddin Firuz Shah, the Sultan of Lakhnauti (in western Bengal). After the successful capture and defeat of Achak Narayan, Tungachal was renamed to Taraf and incorporated into Bangalah (Bengal). Taraf was transformed to an esteemed centre of study in the subcontinent.

Late medieval
Between the thirteenth and early seventeenth centuries, parts of Habiganj were a part of the state of Nasirabad, based in Mymensingh.

Syed Musa became the zamindar of Taraf in the 16th century. During his office, the King of Tripura Amar Manikya called upon the Baro-Bhuiyans to contribute labourers to aid in the digging of a reservoir tank. Musa refused to accept such subordination to the Twipra Kingdom. As a result, the Battle of Jilkua emerged in 1581 leading to the imprisonment of Musa and his son Syed Adam Bairam.

By the middle of the 15th century, when all the divisions of Laur were united under the headship of Baniachang House (now of Muslim faith), it seems the Muslim area of Taraf passed under the control of Baniachung, which now became very powerful to include in its territory, the whole of present Sunamganj and Habiganj subdivisions. A town by the name of Habibganj was founded by Syed Habib Ullah who belonged to the Syed zamindar dynasty of Taraf. The word was later corrupted to Habiganj.

In Baniachang a battle occurred between the Baro-Bhuiyan zamindars of Baniachang (Anwar Khan and Husayn Khan) with the Mughal army in the 17th century, which can be found in the Bahrastan-i-Gayebi. Khwaja Usman fled Bukai Nagar Fort and established a shelter at Putijuri on the foot of the Giripal. He also established a fort at Putijuri, which was extremely important for defense. The Mughal army took the advantage when Khwaja Osman's brother was absent from the fort, leading to the successful annexation of Baniachang and Taraf into Mughal Bengal.

Modern

During the British Raj, Habiganj was established as a Thana (police precinct) in 1790, under Dhaka district (1779–1793).

In the second session of the Congress held in Calcutta in 1886, the Indian National Congress was able to attract representatives from Habiganj District. Until 1896, Habiganj's administrative centre was in Court Andar, Laskarpur. On 12 September 1874 it came under Sylhet district (part of Assam). Habiganj was declared as subdivision in 1867. On 7 April 1893, according to Notification #273 of Assam Provincial Government, Habiganj Thana (Administrative unit) was established. Habiganj was rejoined with East-Bengal (now Bangladesh) in 1911. Then the Office of the Circle Officer (Development) was established in 1960.

Habiganj is the historical place where the Mukti Bahini started their first guerrilla movement against oppression of Pakistani Army. On 4 April 1971, during Bangladesh Liberation War the senior army officers assembled at the headquarters of 2nd East Bengal at Teliapara, a semi hilly area covered by tea gardens where General MAG Osmani, Lieutenant Colonel Abdur Rob, Lieutenant Colonel Salahuddin Mohammad Reja, Major Kazi Nuruzzaman, Major Khaled Mosharraf, Major Nurul Islam, Major Shafat Jamil, Major Mainul Hossain Chowdhury, and others were present.

At this meeting four senior commanders were entrusted with the responsibility of operational areas. Sylhet-Brahmanbaria area was placed under the command of Major Shafiullah, Comilla-Noakhali area was given to Major Khaled Mosharraf while Chittagong-Chittagong Hill Tracts was given to Major Ziaur Rahman and Kushtia-Jessore area was placed under command of Major Abu Osman Chowdhury. In the meeting the organization concept of the freedom fighter forces and the command structure were chalked out under the command of General MAG Osmani.

During the War of Liberation in 1971 an 18 hours direct encounter between the freedom-fighters and the Pakistani-army was held on 16 November 1971, in which freedom-fighter Jagatyoti and 11 villagers were killed by the Pakistani-army.

On 1 March 1984 Habiganj was established as a District. Md. Kamrul Hasan is the Deputy Commissioner.

Demography

According to the 2011 Bangladesh census, Habiganj District had a population of 2,089,001, of which 1,025,591 were males and 1,063,410 females. Rural population was 1,844,035 (88.27%) while the urban population was 244,966 (11.73%). Habiganj district had a literacy rate of 40.53% for the population 7 years and above: 42.22% for males and 38.94% for females.

Muslims make up 82.87% of the population, while Hindus are 16.87% of the population.

About 97% of the population are Bengalis. The ethnic population is 65,802 (3.15%), and is composed of Khasis, Meiteis and Tripuris, as well as the Tea Tribes such as Munda and Oraon. The Tripuris are the original inhabitants of the Tripura Hills, now state of Tripura. During the reign of Maharaj Gharib Nawaz (1709–1748), Meiteis arrived here from their homeland Manipur. The Khasi people migrated to Habiganj from Meghalaya where they arrived some 500 years ago.

Upazila

At present Habiganj consists of 9 upazilas, 6 municipalities, 54 wards, 78 union parishads, 124 mahallas, 1241 mouzas and 2076 villages. The upazilas are:
 Ajmiriganj
 Baniachang
 Bahubal
 Chunarughat
 Habiganj Sadar
 Lakhai
 Madhabpur
 Nabiganj
 Shaistaganj

Geography
Its area is 2,636.58 km2 and bounded by Sunamganj District to the north, Tripura of India and Maulvibazar District to the east, Balaganj Upazila of Sylhet to the north-east, Brahmanbaria and Kishoreganj districts to the west.

This part of Bangladesh is characterized by alluvial plains which are dissected by various connecting rivers as well as streams, lakes; and it is vulnerable to both flood and drought. The land is devoted mainly to agriculture due to its fertile alluvial soils.

Land
Cultivated agricultural land: 1,54,953 hectare (60.22% of the total agricultural land). Forestland 95 11,644 hectare (4.53% of the total land). For crops 51.6% single-crop, 38.7% double-crop and 9.7% triple-crop; fallow 521 hectares. Its rivers include Barak, Bheramahana, Gopala, Kalni, Kalishiri, Khowai, Korangi, Kushiara, Meghna River(lower), Ratna, Shwasanali, shutki, sonai, Korangi, Shutang, Tentulia, Jhingri, Bizna and Yojnal.

Economy
 Tea Gardens: 24 covering total area 15,703.24 hectare.
 Rubber gardens: 3 Rupaichhara-Bahubal (1981). Half of this garden is situated in Habiganj and the rests are in Shreemangal, total area . Shahjibazar-Chunarughat(1978) area , Shatgaon Rubber garden (1971) area .

Rashidpur gas field (1960), Bibiana gas field (1998) and Habiganj gas field (1963). The approximate stock of these gas fields is 5.5 Trillion Cubic Feet. Habiganj gas field lies in Madhabpur Upazila. This field was also discovered by Pakistan Shell Oil Company in 1963. The structure measures 12x5 square km with a vertical closure of 300 m which has a roughly sub-meridian axis tilted slightly eastward at the northern end. Commercial gas production from this field was commenced in 1968 and  till 31 August 2006 total  or 35.42 percent of reserves has been recovered.

Education
There are 20 colleges (3 of which are government-run), 3 technical schools and colleges, 1 polytechnic institute, 95 high schools (6 of which are government-run), and hundreds of primary schools in the district.

Literature and culture
Habigang is famous for folk Literature: Mahuya Sundari and Dhupar Path.

Local newspapers: Daily Habiganj Express, Daily Pravakar, Pratidener Bani, weekly Swadhikar, Swadeshbarta, Drishtikon, Daily Khowai, Habiganj Samachar, Janatar Dalil, Parikrama, fortnightly Prayas, The Daily Habiganjer Ayna and Mritika.

Defunct local newspapers: monthly Moitri (1909), weekly Projapati (1909), Sree Sree Sonar Gauranga (1329 BS), Palli Bani (1940), weekly Shahid (1948), weekly Jagaran (1955), monthly Avijatrik (1966).

Sports

The Habiganj Adhunik Stadium is the largest stadium in Habiganj. The 25,000-capacity venue is used for cricket and football.

Notable people
Nurul Islam Olipuri (born 1955), Islamic scholar
Syed Pir Badshah, medieval Persian-language author
Syed Rayhan ad-Din, medieval Persian-language author
 Tafazzul Haque Habiganji, former vice-president of Hefazat-e-Islam and Jamiat Ulema-e-Islam
Sirajul Hossain Khan, Former Minister (1985-1990), MP, Journalist and former general secretary, east Pakistan journalist union, leftist politician. 
Major General Mohammad Abdur Rab (Bir Uttam), Chief of Staff of Liberation Forces
 Shah Kibria, Former Finance Minister of Bangladesh, d. 2005
 Dewan Farid Gazi, Veteran politician (Awami League) and freedom fighter/activist, Former Minister of Bangladesh
 Major General Chitta Ranjan Dutta- Bir Uttam
 Jagat Joity Das - Bir Bikrom
 Enamul Haque Mostafa Shahid, Veteran politician (Awami League) and freedom fighter/activist, Former Social Welfare Minister of Bangladesh, d. 2016
 Mukhlesur Rahman Chowdhury, former advisor to the President of Bangladesh and minister
 Hemango Biswas, Nationalist Leader, poet and singer
 Syed A. B. Mahmud Hossain, Chief Justice of Bangladesh
 Justice Syed Husain, Chief Justice (since 27 January 2004)
Bipin Chandra Pal, one of the main architects of the Swadeshi movement and part of the Lal Bal Pal triumvirate
Niranjan Pal, playwright and screenwriter
Swami Ashokananda, Hindu monk

Archaeological heritage
 
 Ancient Rajbari (1737–38) at Puranbagh, Baniachang
 Bagala Matar Mandir, Habiganj
 Baniachong village (the biggest village in Asia)
 Bibir Dargah Mosque, Baniachang
 Bithangal Akhra, Baniachang
 Dorga-tila, Mira-tila and Tangee-tila, Nabiganj
 Foltoli-tila and water fountain, Nabiganj
 Jami Mosque, Bahubal
 Kalibari, Habiganj Sadar 
 Habiganj Municipal Building (Foundation & Established on 16 December 1940)
Habiganj Bazar–Shaistaganj–Balla line 
Habiganj Bazar Railway station, Habiganj Sadar 
Habiganj Court Railway station, Habiganj  Sadar 
 Balla Land Port (Bangladesh's no. 23 border land port) Balla, Chunarughat
 Kuri-tila, Black-stone and an Ancient Rajbari, Dinarpur, Nabiganj
 Mashulia Akhra, Habiganj Sadar
 Shankarpasha Shahi Masjid
 Murarband Dargah Sharif, Chunarughat
 Hujra Khana of Syed Nasir Uddin, Murarbandar Dargah Sharif, Chunarughat.
 Putijuri Jami Mosque, Bahubal
 Ramakrishna Ashram, Habiganj Sadar
 Rashidpur Tea Garden, Bahubal Upazila
 Shagor Dighi, Baniachong
 Shajeerbazar, Chunarughat
 Sham-baoul Akhra and Doulotpur Akhra, Baniachang
 War of Liberation Mass Grave, Nabiganj
 War of Liberation Memorial Monument, Nabiganj

Railroad
Habiganj Bazar–Shaistaganj–Balla line 

Shaistaganj-Habiganj railroad section's four railway station established by Assam Bengal railway 1928 
Habiganj Bazar
Habiganj Court 
Dhuliakhal 
Paikpara

Shaistaganj Junction

N.B.: Shaistaganj railway station established by Assam Bengal railway 1903. In 1928-29 when the Habiganj Bazar-Shaistaganj-Balla railway link was opened, it became a junction railway station.

Shaistaganj-Chunarughat railroad section's seven railway station established by Assam Bengal railway 1929 
Barkula
Shakir Muhammed
Sutang Bazar
Chunarughat
Amu Road
Assampara
Balla

Habiganj Bazar–Shaistaganj–Balla line
During the colonial British rule, train services were started by rail at Habiganj Mahukuma in Sylhet district of the then (Undivided British-India) Assam province. In 1928, the British government built the Habiganj Bazar-Shaistaganj-Balla line as railway line and built infrastructure.

The railway line was opened by the Assam Bengal Railway by the then British government from Habiganj district headquarters town to Balla border via Shaistaganj junction, about 45 or 52 kilometers long railway line.

Of these, the Shaistaganj-Habiganj (15 or 16 km) railway line was inaugurated in 1928 and the Shaistaganj-Balla (30 or 36 km) railway line was inaugurated in 1929.

Coal-engined trains used to run between eight stations at Habiganj Bazar, Habiganj Court, Shaistaganj Junction, Shakir Mohammad, Chunarughat, Amuroad, Assampara and Balla bordering Tripura.

Of these, Chunarughat, Amur road and Assampara stations were of great importance. Tea produced in 22 tea gardens from those three stations was transported by rail.

At that time, this railway was the only means of exporting tea leaves of 13 gardens of Chunarughat upazila of Habiganj at a low cost and importing related items including garden rations.

There are a total of 4 stations on the Shaistaganj-Habiganj railway line (excluding Shaistaganj Junction), namely: Habiganj Bazar, Habiganj Court, Dhuliakhal and Paikpara. The Shaistaganj-Balla railway line has a total of 7 stations (excluding Shaistaganj Junction), namely: Barkula, Shakir Muhammed, Sutang Bazar, Chunarughat, Amu Road, Assampara and Balla.

After the independence of Bangladesh, the importance of the Balla train increased further. For this reason, the railway authorities built two more stations named Sutang Bazar and Barkula, known as remote areas.

At that time, the role of the train in bringing back refugees from India was commendable. At that time, a diesel engine was added to the ballar train. The train used to travel twice a day from Habiganj to the border station Balla.

After the end of the refugee transportation phase, the smugglers took over the train in Balla. Later, the train of Balla became a train of smugglers. At first, the passengers protested about this, but later the passengers got the opportunity to travel without a ticket.

In such a situation, the running train suffered losses. The railway authorities suspended the renovation work of the railway line. The train continues at great risk. The speed comes down to 15 kilometers.

During the tenure of the military ruler Ershad government, the train movement on this route was stopped unannounced for the first time. In the face of the movement of passengers, the train started running again within a week. A few days after the BNP came to power in 1991, the movement of the ballar train was again stopped unannounced.

Various social organizations started a movement demanding the movement of trains. For this reason, the government decided to run the train under private management. After running under private management for some time, the train was stopped again.

After the Awami League government came to power in 1996, the then Finance Minister late Shah AMS Kibria, (Member of parliament) elected from Habiganj Sadar-Lakhai Upazila (Habiganj-3) constituency, under the sincere political efforts of the late Shah AMS Kibria, the railway line was upgraded in 2000. Although the train service was started, the last train movement on this line was stopped in 2003.

Ever since the undeclared closure of the BNP-Jamaat coalition government, an influential quarter has been looking at the huge resources of the railways. Around 2005, about 15 kilometers of railway line from Habiganj Bazar to Shaistaganj railway junction was removed on the pretext of making a road. Later, the railway line from Shaistaganj to Habiganj was lifted and a bypass road was constructed.

The Habiganj-Balla train could not be restarted even after a long time. Railway land worth crores of rupees has been occupied by breaking the name of politics. Railway employees who used to stay at different stations are also living by occupying railway land and constructing buildings. Some employees are pocketing money by constructing buildings on railway land and installing tenants.

In 2003, the railway line was abandoned after the train service on this route was stopped. Since then, railway property worth crores of rupees has been looted. In the meantime, valuable equipment of the road and furniture of the station house have been looted.

Now the railway land is being occupied. A section of people are occupying these lands and building buildings. They are cultivating various crops. The name of Shaistaganj Junction is associated with the abandoned railway line. The locals demanded that the train be restarted on this railway line soon to protect the tradition of the junction.

After the Awami League government came to power in 2008, railway minister late Suranjit Sengupta was accorded a reception by the people of Shaistaganj. At that time, he assured that the Balla train would be started within a few days. When Suranjit Sen became a political victim, the train from Habiganj Sadar to Balla could not be started again.

The train from Habiganj Sadar to Balla is still closed. Locals said four of the habiganj-Shaistaganj-Balla railway stations are located in Habiganj Sadar upazila and seven in Chunarughat upazila. Shaistaganj Junction in Shaistaganj Upazila. That is why on the eve of the 11th parliamentary election, various demands were raised from the common people, including the introduction of the Ballar train from Habiganj Sadar, the recovery of the land of the train.

During the election campaign, Awami League leaders also assured to start the Ballar train from Habiganj Sadar, but even after the past years, no word has been uttered from the leaders about the introduction of the train. The expectations of the people of Chunarughat-Madhabpur upazila (Habiganj-4) have increased a lot after Mahbub Ali, (Member of parliament), became the state minister for civil aviation and tourism.

The common people think that Minister Mahbub Ali can restart the Balla train from Habiganj Bazar i.e. Habiganj Sadar to Chunarughat Balla Land Port, the tradition of the area and Habiganj district. And ordinary people are looking for the way in that hope.

Railway History

The Habiganj Bazar–Shaistaganj–Balla line is a railway line connecting Akhaura and Chhatak, via Kulaura in Bangladesh. This line is under the jurisdiction of Bangladesh Railway. Shaistaganj Junction railway station is a junction station situated in Shayestaganj Upazila of Habiganj District in Bangladesh. It was opened in 1903 on Akhaura–Kulaura–Chhatak line. Then it became a junction station when Habiganj Bazar–Shaistaganj–Balla line railway was opened in 1928–29. But later in 2003, that line was abandoned as is closed in an unannounced manner and in 2005, the Habiganj Bazar–Shaistaganj line was taken off.

In response to the demands of the Assam tea planters for a railway link to Chittagong port, Assam Bengal Railway started construction of a railway track on the eastern side of Bengal in 1891. A  track between Chittagong and Comilla was opened to traffic in 1895. The Comilla–Akhaura–Kulaura–Badarpur section was opened in 1896–98 and extended to Lumding by 1903.

The Kulaura-Sylhet section was opened 1912–15, the Shaistaganj-Habiganj branch line in 1928, the Shaistaganj–Balla branch line in 1929 and the Sylhet–Chhatak Bazar line in 1954.

A metre gauge link exists between Shahbajpur in Bangladesh and Mahisasan in India.

See also
 Taraf Kingdom
 Districts of Bangladesh

Notes

References

 
Districts of Bangladesh